Dexter's Laboratory is an American animated television series created by Genndy Tartakovsky for Cartoon Network and distributed by Warner Bros. Domestic Television Distribution. The series follows Dexter, an enthusiastic boy-genius with a hidden science laboratory in his room full of inventions, which he keeps secret from his clueless parents, who are only referred to as "Mom" and "Dad". Dexter is at constant odds with his older and more extroverted sister Dee Dee, who always gains access to the lab and inadvertently foils his experiments. Dexter has a bitter rivalry with his neighbor and classmate Mandark, a nefarious boy-genius who attempts to undermine Dexter at every opportunity. Prominently featured in the first and second seasons are other segments focusing on superhero-based characters Monkey, Dexter's pet lab-monkey/superhero, and the Justice Friends, a trio of superheroes who share an apartment.

Tartakovsky pitched the series to Fred Seibert's first animated shorts showcase What a Cartoon! at Hanna-Barbera, basing it on student films he produced at the California Institute of the Arts. Four pilots aired on Cartoon Network and TNT from 1995 to 1996. Viewer approval ratings led to a half-hour series, which consisted of two seasons totaling 52 episodes, airing from April 27, 1996, to June 15, 1998. On December 10, 1999, a television film titled Dexter's Laboratory: Ego Trip aired as the intended series finale, and Tartakovsky left to begin working on Samurai Jack.

In November 2000, the series was renewed for two seasons containing 26 total episodes, which began airing on November 18, 2001, and concluded on November 20, 2003. Due to Tartakovsky's departure, the last two seasons featured Chris Savino as showrunner along with a new production team at Cartoon Network Studios with changes made to the visual art style and character designs.

Dexter's Laboratory won three Annie Awards, with nominations for four Primetime Emmy Awards, four Golden Reel Awards, and nine other Annie Awards. The series is notable for helping launch the careers of animators Craig McCracken, Seth MacFarlane, Butch Hartman, Paul Rudish, and Rob Renzetti. Spin-off media include children's books, comic books, DVD and VHS releases, music albums, toys, and video games.

Premise 
Dexter (voiced by Christine Cavanaugh in seasons 1–3; Candi Milo in seasons 3–4) is a bespectacled boy-genius who, behind a bookcase in his bedroom, conceals a secret laboratory, which can be accessed by spoken passwords or hidden switches on his bookshelf. Though highly intelligent, Dexter often fails to achieve his goals when he becomes overexcited and careless. Although he comes from a typical American family, Dexter speaks with an accent of indeterminate origin. Christine Cavanaugh described it as "an affectation, [a] kind of accent, we're not quite sure. A small Peter Lorre, but not. Perhaps he's Latino, perhaps he's French. He's a scientist; he knows he needs [a] kind of accent." Genndy Tartakovsky explained, "he's a scientist. All scientists are foreign and have accents...It's not really a German accent. It's just Eastern European."

Dexter conceals his lab from his clueless parents, addressed only as Mom (voiced by Kath Soucie) and Dad (voiced by Jeff Bennett), who never take notice of it. His hyperactive, good-hearted, older sister Dee Dee (voiced by Allison Moore in seasons 1 and 3 and by Kat Cressida in seasons 2 and 4) delights in playing haphazardly in the lab, wreaking havoc with Dexter's inventions. Though seemingly dim-witted, Dee Dee, who is also a talented ballet dancer, can outsmart her brother and even give him helpful advice. For his part, Dexter, though annoyed by his intrusive sibling, feels a reluctant affection for her and will come to her defense if she is imperiled.

Dexter's nemesis is rival classmate Mandark Astronomonov (voiced by Eddie Deezen). Like Dexter, Mandark is a boy genius with his own laboratory, but his schemes are generally evil and designed to gain power or downplay or destroy Dexter's accomplishments. In revival seasons, Mandark becomes significantly more evil, becoming Dexter's enemy rather than his rival, and Mandark's laboratory changes from brightly lit with rounded features to gothic-looking, industrial, and angular. Dexter's inventions are objectively better than his, and Mandark tries to compensate for this by stealing Dexter's plans. Mandark's weakness is his unrequited love for Dee Dee.

Recurring segments 
Every Dexter's Laboratory episode, with the exception of "Last But Not Beast", is divided into different stories or segments, each being 7–12 minutes long. Occasionally, a segment centers on characters other than Dexter and his family. Two segments are shown primarily during season one: Dial M for Monkey and The Justice Friends. Dial M for Monkey is the middle segment for six episodes of season one, and The Justice Friends takes its place until season one's end.

Dial M for Monkey 
Dial M for Monkey shorts feature Dexter's pet laboratory monkey named Monkey (vocal effects provided by Frank Welker), whom Dexter believes is an ordinary monkey and nothing more. However, Monkey secretly has superpowers and fights evil as a superhero named Monkey. Monkey is joined by his partner Agent Honeydew (voiced by Kath Soucie) of Global Security, Commander General (voiced by Robert Ridgely in season 1, Earl Boen in season 2), and a team of assembled superheroes. Dial M for Monkey was created by Genndy Tartakovsky, Craig McCracken, and Paul Rudish. Monkey's superpowers include super-strength, telekinesis, flight, and super speed, among others.

The Justice Friends 
The Justice Friends consists of Major Glory (voiced by Rob Paulsen) of whom Dexter himself is revealed to be a fan and collects Major Glory action-figures, Valhallen (voiced by Tom Kenny), and the Infraggable Krunk (voiced by Frank Welker), a trio of superhero roommates residing in an apartment called Muscular Arms. Their adventures deal less with superhero life and more with an inability to agree with each other; it is presented much like a sitcom, including a laugh track. Genndy Tartakovsky's inspiration for The Justice Friends came from reading Marvel Comics when learning how to speak English. Tartakovsky stated in a 2001 IGN interview that he was disappointed with how The Justice Friends turned out, saying, "it could have been funnier and the characters could have been fleshed out more."

Mini-segments 
Between the three main segments in seasons one and two are brief mini-segments, which often feature only Dexter and Dee Dee. Other characters that star in these include "The Puppet Pals" - two live-action puppets named Puppet Pal Clem (voiced by Rob Paulsen) and Puppet Pal Mitch (voiced by Tom Kenny).

Production 

Genndy Tartakovsky, the creator of Dexter's Laboratory, was born in Moscow, where his father, a dentist, served in the government of the Soviet Union. Although relatively wealthy and well-connected, his family feared racial persecution due to their Jewish heritage and moved to the United States when Tartakovsky was seven. Along with his older brother, Alex, Tartakovsky taught himself how to draw as a child by copying comic books.

After transferring from Columbia College Chicago to the California Institute of the Arts in 1990 to study animation, Tartakovsky wrote, directed, animated, and produced two student short films, one of which was a precursor to Dexter's Laboratory's television pilot, "Changes". Described as a two-and-a-half-minute pencil test, this short film was included in a university screening for the producers of Batman: The Animated Series, who were impressed and hired Tartakovsky.

Later on, Tartakovsky joined the production team of 2 Stupid Dogs. His co-workers on that series, Craig McCracken, Rob Renzetti, Paul Rudish, and Lou Romano, had been classmates of his at Cal Arts and went on to collaborate with him on Dexter's Laboratory. Tartakovsky's last job before developing Dexter's Laboratory into a television series was to serve as a sheet timer on The Critic. During his time on that series, Tartakovsky received a phone call from Larry Huber, who had been a producer on 2 Stupid Dogs. Huber had shown Tartakovsky's unfinished student film to a then-nascent Cartoon Network and wanted Tartakovsky to develop the concept into a seven-minute storyboard.

Unhappy with his position on The Critic, Tartakovsky accepted Huber's proposal, and the resulting project, "Changes", was produced as part of Cartoon Network's animation showcase series, World Premiere Toons, debuting on February 26, 1995. Viewers worldwide voted through phone lines, websites, focus groups, and consumer promotions for their favorite short cartoons; Dexter's Laboratory was the first of 16 to earn that vote of approval. Mike Lazzo, then-head of programming for Cartoon Network, said in 1996 that it was his favorite of the 48 shorts that had been produced by that point, commenting that he and colleagues "loved the humor in the brother-versus-sister relationship".

Even after "Changes" premiered, Tartakovsky had no expectations that it would lead to an entire series. In 2018, he noted that his generation was the first in which people could become showrunners at a young age, saying, "Everybody before us were in their forties, at least, and so [our generation's experience] was a very different way to do something where we had no clue what we were doing and we were just trying to make each other laugh." When Dexter's Laboratory received a series green-light, Tartakovsky became, at age twenty-seven, one of the youngest animation directors of that era. Speaking with the Los Angeles Times in 2002, Tartakovsky remarked about the network, "With Cartoon Network, they were looking for more undiscovered talent, people that may have had a hard time getting in.[...]It became a great opportunity to do something. And as I got into it, I realized that they were also offering the creative freedom. They were letting the creators make the shows."

Tartakovsky's former classmates McCracken and Rudish helped him design "Changes". Soon afterward, Tartakovsky helped McCracken create his own short film for World Premiere Toons/What a Cartoon!, which would eventually become the basis for The Powerpuff Girls. After finishing McCracken's project, the group proceeded to a second short film for Dexter's Laboratory, titled "The Big Sister". At the time, Tartakovsky was still not anticipating a series green-light for Dexter's Laboratory. He went on to reminisce that, in those days, he was simply having fun working on short films with his friends. Tartakovsky and McCracken, who had been roommates shortly after college, went on to become regular collaborators on each other's series. Animation historian David Perlmutter noted a symbiosis between the two men, which he felt led to stylistic similarities between Dexter's Laboratory and The Powerpuff Girls.

In August 1995, Turner ordered six half-hours of Dexter's Laboratory, which included two cartoons of one spin-off segment titled Dial M for Monkey. In addition to Tartakovsky, McCracken, Renzetti, and Rudish, directors and writers on Dexter's Laboratory included Seth MacFarlane, Butch Hartman, John McIntyre, and Chris Savino. McCracken also served as an art director on the series. Perlmutter described McCracken's role on Dexter's Laboratory as that of Tartakovsky's "effective second-in-command".

Conception 
Dexter's Laboratory originated with one of Genndy Tartakovsky's designs of a ballet dancer. While attending CalArts, Tartakovsky drew a tall, thin girl dancing and decided to pair her with a short and blocky opposite. These two characters would eventually develop into Dee Dee and Dexter respectively, although they went unnamed until Tartakovsky started expanding the concept for Cartoon Network. To further contrast the two characters, Tartakovsky determined that Dee Dee would be artistic, while Dexter would be focused on science. In an interview, Tartakovsky said, "Dee Dee came first. She was really the star of the show to me. She was so much fun. Later on, I started on Dexter and he took over."

The names Dexter and Dee Dee were both found in name books; "Dexter" caught Tartakovsky's attention for sounding scientific, while "Dee Dee" appealed to him because of its uniqueness and because he felt that it complemented that character's two pigtails. Before settling on these options, Tartakovsky had considered titling the series Dartmouth and Daisy. Explaining why he discarded this idea, Tartakovsky said that "Dartmouth doesn't exactly roll off the tongue" and that the name Daisy was already heavily associated with Disney. The title Dexter's Laboratory was not settled on until around midway through production of the series' pilot episode, "Changes".

The ages of Dexter and Dee Dee are meant to be nebulous. Although Tartakovsky suggested that Dexter is intended to be about six to eight years old and that Dee Dee is "a couple years older", he also stressed that he would "never want" to specify Dexter's exact age. Tartakovsky wrote Dexter as a hardworking, unspoiled "Midwest kid" who loves food and explained, "I'm not saying he's from Chicago, but there's a reason he's got his own burrito palace, just like I had growing up in Chicago."

The sibling dynamic in Dexter's Laboratory was partially modeled on Tartakovsky's relationship with his older brother, Alex. Comparing himself to Dee Dee and Alex, who became a computer engineer, to Dexter, Tartakovsky acknowledged that he was most likely a "pest" to his older brother while they were growing up. Another time, he reminisced that as kids, he and his brother could each be a "pain in the ass" to the other. To illustrate one of the parallels between his childhood and the series, Tartakovsky noted that Alex had kept him from playing with "intricate" toy soldiers in those days, much like Dexter attempts to keep Dee Dee away from his inventions.

Tartakovsky determined that Dexter should have an accent because the character "considers himself a very serious scientist, and all well-known scientists have accents." During one interview, Tartakovsky suggested that viewers should decide for themselves whether or not the character's accent is an affectation, saying that "[n]obody knows" whether the character is "pretending to be a German scientist" or is speaking naturally. Although Tartakovsky noted in a separate interview that Dexter's accent is not meant to denote any specific nationality, he revealed in a 2012 Reddit AMA that it was partially inspired by "a funny French accent" done by his college roommate.

Tartakovsky also drew inspiration from his experiences as an immigrant growing up in Chicago. He explained that, like Dexter, he had a "very thick accent" as a child—and even though he lived in a diverse neighborhood, children would tease him for this. Speaking with The Jewish Journal of Greater Los Angeles in 2001, Tartakovsky explained, "When I moved to America, I wanted to fit in and be American...We never tried to be too heavy-handed with Dexter's, but if you look at the underlying themes of the show, it's about a little kid trying to fit in." Tartakovsky noted that when he was a child, he was less confident than the character, telling The New York Times, "The one thing about Dexter, if he doesn't fit in, he'll start his own club. He's not afraid to be an outsider."

Linda Simensky, who served as senior vice-president of Original Animation for Cartoon Network during the production of Dexter's Laboratory, wrote in 2011 that Dexter was designed "to be more of an icon in some ways"; she continued, "his body was short and squat and his design was simple, with a black outline and relatively little detail... Since Tartakovsky knew he was developing Dexter for television, he purposely limited the design to a degree, designing the nose and mouth, for instance, in a Hanna-Barbera style to animate easily." This simplistic style was influenced by UPA shorts, as well as by the Merrie Melodies cartoon The Dover Boys. Simensky noted though, that in contrast to those cartoons, Dexter's Laboratory is "staged cinematically, rather than flat and close to the screen, to leave space and depth for the action and gags in the lab". Tartakovsky was also influenced by Warner Bros. cartoons, Hanna-Barbera, and Japanese anime.

Original run 
Dexter's Laboratory premiered on TNT on April 27, 1996, and the following day on Cartoon Network and TBS. It became the first in a brand of Cartoon Network original cartoons, later including Cow and Chicken, I Am Weasel, Johnny Bravo, The Powerpuff Girls, Ed, Edd n Eddy, and Courage the Cowardly Dog, collectively known as Cartoon Cartoons. A second season was ordered, which premiered on Cartoon Network on July 16, 1997. This run of the series includes the episode "Dexter and Computress Get Mandark!", whose author was a seven-year-old boy from Long Island named Tyler Samuel Lee, who submitted his story to Tartakovsky as an audiotape. Tyler's recorded narration was used in the episode, and Tartakovsky (who often received letters and comments from other fans) said that Tyler had "a great understanding of the show and genuinely captured the imaginative kid perspective we're always striving for."

Dexter's Laboratory went on hiatus on June 15, 1998, after two seasons, with season two lasting 39 episodes. The series finale was initially intended to be "Last But Not Beast", which differed from the format of other episodes, in that it was a single 25-minute episode, rather than a collection of shorter segments. By this point, Tartakovsky was exhausted. His focus on the series had cost him two relationships, and he went on to joke that the process of running Dexter's Laboratory was like "giving birth to ten children." After putting the series on hiatus, Tartakovsky became a supervising producer on colleague Craig McCracken's series, The Powerpuff Girls; he also directed episodes of that series and worked on The Powerpuff Girls Movie. After the movie, McCracken would later go on to create Foster's Home for Imaginary Friends, also for Cartoon Network. Both Hartman and MacFarlane left Cartoon Network altogether at this point; they moved on to create The Fairly OddParents and Family Guy, respectively. Rob Renzetti would later go on to create My Life as a Teenage Robot for Nickelodeon. Paul Rudish would also have a chance to develop an animated series for Disney Television Animation; he would reboot Mickey Mouse in 2013 for Disney Channel and 2020 for Disney+.

In 1999, Tartakovsky returned to direct Dexter's Laboratory: Ego Trip, an hour-long television movie. It was his last Dexter's Laboratory production to be involved with and was intended to be its conclusion. Ego Trip was hand-animated, though character and setting designs were subtly revised. Its plot follows Dexter on a quest through time to discover his future triumphs.

Revival 
On February 21, 2001, Cartoon Network issued a press release stating that Dexter's Laboratory had been revived for a 13-episode third season. The series was given a new production team at Cartoon Network Studios, and Chris Savino took over the role of creative director from Tartakovsky, who at the time was immersed in launching his next series, Samurai Jack. During season four of Dexter's Laboratory, Savino was promoted to producer giving him further control of the series, including the budget. Revival episodes featured revised visual designs and sound effects, recast voice actors, continuity shakeups, and a transition from traditional cel animation, which was used until Ego Trip, to digital ink and paint, which was used permanently beginning with season three's premiere.

Christine Cavanaugh voiced Dexter for early episodes of season three, but she retired from voice acting in 2001 for personal reasons. She was replaced by Candi Milo. Allison Moore, a college friend of Tartakovsky, was cast as Dee Dee. Moore's role was later recast with Kat Cressida. In season three, Moore briefly returned to voice Dee Dee before Cressida again assumed her role for season four. The character redesigns were handled by Dexter's original creator Genndy Tartakovsky, with the help of one of Dexter's original model designers, Chris Battle, known individually for acting as character designer for Nickelodeon's Aaahh!!! Real Monsters and Cartoon Network's The Powerpuff Girls. Aaron Springer and Chris Reccardi are also credited on the writing staff.

Episodes 

Dexter's Laboratory broadcast 78 half-hour episodes over 4 seasons during its 7-year run. Four pilot shorts were produced for What a Cartoon! that aired from 1995 to 1996, and were reconnected into season one in later airings. Fifty-two episodes were produced from 1996 to 1998, followed by Ego Trip in 1999.

Another 26 episodes were produced and broadcast from 2001 to 2003. "Chicken Scratch" debuted theatrically with The Powerpuff Girls Movie in 2002, and was later broadcast in season four.

Broadcast 
On December 31, 2000, Cartoon Network aired its "New Year's Bash" marathon featuring Dexter's Laboratory among other programs. On November 18, 2001, it broadcast a 12-hour "Dexter Goes Global" marathon in 96 countries and 12 languages. This marathon featured fan-selected episodes of Dexter's Laboratory and culminated by premiering two new episodes of season 3.

From 2005 to 2008, Dexter's Laboratory was rerun in segments on The Cartoon Cartoon Show with other Cartoon Cartoons from that era. From 2012 to 2014, it returned in reruns on the revived block, Cartoon Planet.

From January 16, 2006, to January 4, 2015, Dexter's Laboratory aired reruns on Boomerang. Occasionally reruns of the series still occur.

Cartoon Network has aired reruns in Canada since its launch on July 4, 2012. This launch was commemorated by parent network Teletoon, which aired Cartoon Network-related programming blocks and promotions in weeks leading up to it, including episodes of Dexter's Laboratory.

Controversial episodes 
"Dial M for Monkey: Barbequor", a season 1 episode from 1996, was removed from rotation after being broadcast in the United States. It features a character named the Silver Spooner (a spoof of Silver Surfer), which was perceived by Cartoon Network to be a stereotype of gay men. Second, Krunk appears to become drunk, has a hangover, and vomits off-camera. In later broadcasts and on its Season 1 DVD (Region 1), "Barbequor" has been replaced with "Dexter's Lab: A Story", an episode from season two.

"Rude Removal", a season 2 episode, was produced but not aired. It involves Dexter creating a "rude removal system" to diminish Dee Dee and Dexter's rudeness; however, it instead creates highly rude clones of both siblings. "Rude Removal" was only shown during certain animation festivals and was never aired on television due to characters swearing, even though all swear words were censored. Tartakovsky commented that "standards didn't like it." Linda Simensky, then-vice president of original programming for Cartoon Network, said "I still think it's very funny. It probably would air better late at night." Michelle Klein-Häss of Animation World Network called the episode "hilarious" after viewing it at the 1998 World Animation Celebration, although she predicted that it would "never be shown on television". In October 2012, Genndy Tartakovsky was asked about "Rude Removal" during an AMA on Reddit, and he replied "Next time I do a public appearance I'll bring it with me!" Adult Swim later asked fans on Twitter if interest still existed with it, and fan response was "overwhelming". "Rude Removal" was finally uploaded on Adult Swim's official YouTube account on January 22, 2013.

Reception 
Dexter's Laboratory was one of Cartoon Network's highest-rated original series for years. Internationally, it garnered a special mention for best script at the 1997 Cartoons on the Bay animation festival in Italy. From 1998–2000, a Dexter balloon was featured in Macy's Thanksgiving Day Parade alongside other iconic characters, including the titular piglet from Babe whom Christine Cavanaugh voiced. The series was part of Cartoon Network's 20% ratings surge during mid-1999. On July 7, 2000, the series was the network's highest-rated original telecast among households (3.1), kids 2–11 (7.8), and kids 6–11 (8.4), with a delivery of almost 2 million homes. On July 31, 2001, it scored the highest household rating (2.9) and delivery (2,166,000 homes) for a Cartoon Network telecast for that year. Dexter's Laboratory was one of the network's highest-rated original series of 2002.

Critical reception 
One of Cartoon Network president Betty Cohen's favorite animated shows was Dexter's Laboratory. Rapper Coolio stated in an August 2002 Billboard interview that he is a fan of the series, stating, "I watch a lot of cartoons because I have kids. I actually watch more cartoons than movies."

Shortly after the premiere of its first season, Dexter's Laboratory was hailed as one of the best new series on Cartoon Network by Ted Cox of the Daily Herald. In the lead up to its second season, Dexter's Laboratory was called the most imaginative series on Cartoon Network by Nancy McAlister of The Florida Times-Union. Although McAlister critiqued the gender stereotyping of Dexter's parents, she acknowledged that she was only applying such scrutiny to the series because Dexter's Laboratory had helped convince her that "viewers should take animated programming seriously".

In 1997, Bill Ward of the Star Tribune named Dexter's Laboratory to his Critic's Choice list, recommending it for the "young of all ages". In a 2012 top 10 list by Entertainment Weekly, Dexter's Laboratory was ranked as the fourth best Cartoon Network series. In 2009, Dexter's Laboratory was named 72nd best animated series by IGN, whose editors remarked, "Aimed at and immediately accessible to children, Dexter's Laboratory was part of a new generation of animated series that played on two levels, simultaneously fun for both kids and adults." In his 2015 book Animation: A World History Volume III: Contemporary Times, Giannalberto Bendazzi called Dexter's Laboratory "visually and verbally innovative". He considered the series to be a groundbreaking work of pop art, likening its visual style to both street art and the designs of Takashi Murakami. David Perlmutter wrote in his 2018 book, The Encyclopedia of American Animated Television Shows, that all three segments of Dexter's Laboratory (the main scenario, along with Dial M for Monkey and The Justice Friends) elevate stereotypical ideas through an approach that contains "verve and originality". Perlmutter called the series more "complex" than it first seems. He praised the staging of action sequences throughout the series and wrote that Dexter's Laboratory is "much more effective (and funny) than it would have been under a director less committed to the project [than Tartakovsky]."

Legacy 
As affirmed by Giannalberto Bendazzi in Animation: A World History Volume III, Dexter's Laboratory, along with Craig McCracken's The Powerpuff Girls, helped define the style of Cartoon Network, both for being works "in which lines and colour are predominant", and for underlining their graphic aspect through limited animation. Television critic Robert Lloyd claimed that both artists were "at the forefront of a second wave of innovative, creator-driven television animation, whose first wave began in the 1990s with the likes of Ralph Bakshi's Mighty Mouse: The New Adventures and John Kricfalusi’s The Ren & Stimpy Show." The show has also been credited for "kickstarting" the channel's ascent and launching Tartakovsky's career, which later gave way to Samurai Jack and Star Wars: Clone Wars. To this, Gizmodo's editor Beth Elderkin adds: "Since then, he's become a staple in children's and adult animation, responsible for everything from the Hotel Transylvania series to the powerful (and ultra-violent) Primal." Vulture calls the first pilot episode "a testament to Tartakovsky's talent and commitment as a filmmaker and a proof of concept for the What a Cartoon! anthology format." For a while, the show's simplistic look was adopted by other American cartoons; animator Butch Hartman said: "When I started making Fairly OddParents, I took cues from what Genndy did in terms of simplifying the designs and using bold colors and simple shapes."

Awards and nominations

Merchandise

Home media 
Dexter's Laboratory first appeared in home media on three VHS tapes from 2000 to 2001. Episodes had not been officially released before this, except for a complete series DVD contest prize in 1999.

Warner Bros. stated in a 2006 interview that they were "...in conversations with Cartoon Network" for DVD collections of cartoons, among which was Dexter's Laboratory. Madman Entertainment released season one and part of season two in Region 4 in 2008. A Region 1 release of season one was released by Warner Home Video on October 12, 2010. It was third official release of a Cartoon Cartoon on DVD under the "Cartoon Network Hall of Fame" label.

Every episode, except for the television film Ego Trip and the banned "Rude Removal" episode, became available on iTunes in 2010. "Rude Removal" later became available on Adult Swim's official YouTube channel on January 22, 2013, but it has been prevented from being released on any home media for its obscenities. Dexter's Laboratory was formerly released on Hulu and is currently on HBO Max and Amazon Prime Video as of January 2023. Cartoon Network Racing, a PlayStation 2 video game, contains the episodes "Dexter's Rival" and "Mandarker" as unlockable extras.

Music releases 
Dexter's Laboratory has spawned two music soundtrack albums: The Musical Time Machine, which was released by Atlantic Records on May 19, 1998, and The Hip-Hop Experiment, which was released by the Kid Rhino and Atlantic Records dual label on August 20, 2002. The Hip-Hop Experiment concurrently released with three hip hop music videos for the tracks "Back to the Lab" by Prince Paul, "Dexter (What's His Name?)" by Coolio, and "Secrets" by will.i.am. A fourth music video featuring Japanese-style animation was released by They Might Be Giants for the song "Dee Dee and Dexter", which was produced by Klasky Csupo, the animation studio known for producing Nickelodeon's Rugrats, Aaahh!!! Real Monsters, The Wild Thornberrys, Rocket Power, and As Told by Ginger animated series. Upon Cartoon Network's request for the artist to write an original song for Dexter's Laboratory: The Hip-Hop Experiment, rapper Coolio, who provided the track "Dexter (What's His Name?)", stated, "I didn't really know what I wanted to do at first, but I knew I wanted it to be positive and lively." Three Dexter's Laboratory tracks are featured on Cartoon Network's 1999 compilation album Cartoon Medley.

Publications 
Books set in Dexter's Laboratory were released by Scholastic and Golden Books.

Characters from Dexter's Laboratory are featured in a 150,000-print magazine called Cartoon Network, published by Burghley Publishing and released in the United Kingdom on August 27, 1998.

DC Comics printed four comic book volumes featuring Dexter's Laboratory. Characters from the series first appear in Cartoon Network Presents, a 24-issue volume showcasing Cartoon Network's premiere animated programming, which was produced from 1997 to 1999. In 1999, DC gave Dexter's Laboratory its own 34-issue comic volume, which ran until 2003. DC's Cartoon Cartoons comic book, which ran from 2001 to 2004, frequently includes Dexter's Laboratory stories. This was superseded by Cartoon Network Block Party, which ran from 2004 to 2009.

On February 25, 2013, IDW Publishing announced a partnership with Cartoon Network to produce comics based on its properties, which included Dexter's Laboratory. Its first issue was released on April 30, 2014.

Toys and promotions 
In November 1997, Wendy's promoted Dexter's Laboratory with six collectible toys in their kids' meals. A Subway promotion supported by Publicis & Hal Riney of Chicago lasted from August 23 to October 3, 1999, called "Dexter's Super Computer Giveaway", in which a computer, monitor, games, software, and an exclusive set of Dexter's Laboratory DVDs were given out as prizes. Discovery Zone sponsored Cartoon Network's eight-week-long "Dexter's Duplication Summer" in 1998 to promote the series' new schedule. Trendmasters released a series of Dexter's Lab figures and playsets in 2001. Six kids' meal toys were sold during an April 2001 Dairy Queen promotion. That month, Cartoon Network and Perfetti Van Melle launched the "Out of Control" promotion, which included on-air marketing and a sweepstakes to win an "Air Dextron" entertainment center. The following April, a similar promotion featured Dexter's Laboratory-themed Airheads packs and an online sweepstakes. Subway promoted Dexter's Laboratory from April 1 to May 15, 2002, with four kids' meal toys. In September 2003, Burger King sponsored Dexter's Laboratory toys with kids' meals during a larger promotion featuring online games, Cartoon Orbit codes, and new episodes. In the United Kingdom, the characters of Dexter and Dee Dee were given away in Kellogg's cereal boxes as part of the Cartoon Network Wobble Heads in 2003. A trading card series was also published by Artbox Entertainment.

Race to the Brainergizer and The Incredible Invention Versus Dee Dee, two board games, were released by Pressman Toy Corporation in 2001.

Video games 
Six Dexter's Laboratory video games have been released: Robot Rampage for the Nintendo Game Boy Color, Chess Challenge and Deesaster Strikes! for the Nintendo Game Boy Advance, Mandark's Lab? for the Sony PlayStation, Dexter's Laboratory: Science Ain't Fair for PC, and Dexter's Laboratory: Security Alert! for mobile phones.

Similar to Battle Chess, Chess Challenge is a chess video game that triggers battle animations each time an overtaking move occurs. Each capture is accompanied by the sequences set in Dexter's home depicting the piece's defeat. Those scenes are set in Dexter's home with magic attacks and Dee Dee's toys having an appearance. The completion of the puzzles will unlock certain game modes, including a two-player mode.

A Dexter's Laboratory combat-style action video game on PlayStation 2 and Nintendo GameCube was set to be developed by n-Space, published by BAM! Entertainment, and distributed in Europe by Acclaim Entertainment for a 2004 release, but it was canceled. On February 15, 2005, Midway Games announced plans to develop and produce a new Dexter's Laboratory video game for multiple consoles, but it was never published.

Dexter, Mandark, Dee Dee, Dexter's computer, and Major Glory, as well as items, areas, and inventions are featured in the MMORPG FusionFall. Dexter's Laboratory characters are featured in Cartoon Network Racing and Cartoon Network: Punch Time Explosion. Punch Time Explosion features different voice talent for Dexter (Tara Strong instead of Christine Cavanaugh or Candi Milo) and Monkey (Fred Tatasciore instead of Frank Welker).

See also 
 List of fictional scientists and engineers
 List of works produced by Hanna-Barbera Productions
 List of Hanna-Barbera characters

Notes

References

Further reading

External links 

  (archive)
 
  (archive)
 
 
 

 
1990s American animated television series
1990s American children's comedy television series
1990s American comic science fiction television series
1996 American television series debuts
2000s American animated television series
2000s American children's comedy television series
2000s American comic science fiction television series
2003 American television series endings
American children's animated adventure television series
American children's animated comic science fiction television series
American children's animated science fantasy television series
American television series revived after cancellation
Animated television series about children
Animated television series about families
Animated television series about siblings
Anime-influenced Western animated television series
Annie Award winners
Cartoon Cartoons
Cartoon Network original programming
Television series by Cartoon Network Studios
Television series by Rough Draft Studios
Elementary school television series
English-language television shows
Fictional laboratories
Television series about geniuses
Television series by Hanna-Barbera
Television series created by Genndy Tartakovsky
Television shows adapted into comics